The Man Bites Man EP was a CD containing 4 tracks that was used to promote Dogs Die in Hot Cars, who were at the time working on their debut album: Please Describe Yourself. The release was limited to 1000 copies. The third track on this CD was used in an advertising campaign for Boots. Also, the recording of "Pastimes & Lifestyles" found on this EP is different from that of the version found on their debut - the most notable difference being that the bridge before the last chorus on this version is longer.

Clive Langer and Alan Winstanley (who produced the band's debut album) produced the first track on this CD, while Paul Tipler produced tracks 2 and 4, and track 3 was produced by Craig Macintosh - the band's lead singer.

Track listing
"Man Bites Man" - 3:41
"Queen of Pumpkin Plukes" - 3:07
"Nobody Teaches Life Anything" - 2:19
"Pastimes & Lifestyles" 4:03

2004 debut EPs
Dogs Die in Hot Cars albums